Épisy is a former commune in the Seine-et-Marne department in the Île-de-France region in north-central France. On 1 January 2016, it was merged into the new commune Moret-Loing-et-Orvanne. Inhabitants of Épisy are called Épisiens.

Geography
The river Lunain flows into the Loing in the commune.

See also
Communes of the Seine-et-Marne department

References

External links

1999 Land Use, from IAURIF (Institute for Urban Planning and Development of the Paris-Île-de-France région) 

Former communes of Seine-et-Marne